The bare-faced bulbul (Nok hualon) is a member of the bulbul family of passerine birds. It was newly described from central Laos in 2009. It is one of the very few Asian songbirds with a bald (featherless) face and is the first new species of bulbul to be described from Asia in almost a century.

Taxonomy and systematics

The species epithet hualon is from the Lao word for "bald-headed". A 2018 molecular phylogenetic study of the bulbuls suggested that the species does not fit in the clade containing the core Pycnonotus and stood apart suggesting its placement in a new genus Nok from Lao language for "bird" as Nok hualon.

Description
The mainly olive-green bare-faced bulbul is distinctive in having a bare pink face with blueish skin around the eyes.  The two specimens so far collected were around 20 cm in length and weighed 32-40 g. The breast and belly are fawn-grey, the uppersides olive and the throat is off-white. According to researchers, its call is a "dry bubbly tweet".

Habitat
The bare-faced bulbul is known only from the limestone karst region near Pha Lom in central Laos. The area is characterised by steep terrain with bare limestone and low (less than 4 m in height) deciduous trees and shrubs. It seems likely that the species is restricted entirely to this habitat, though it may occur at other sites in Laos with similar habitats. Observations of similar birds were made in 1995 at another site. Limestone karst is the habitat of several newly discovered endemic species, including the unusual Laotian rock rat.

Behaviour
The bare-faced bulbul is mainly arboreal but sometimes perches on rocks on the steep hillsides. It is a conspicuous species, foraging during the day in pairs or as singles. Single birds tend to call regularly, and will link up with another before flying to a new area to forage. They have not been observed to join mixed-species feeding flocks. The breeding behaviour of this species has not yet been observed.

Status and conservation
The bare-faced bulbul was assessed for the first time in 2010 by BirdLife International as of Least Concern, on the basis that the species has a large range, and there is insufficient evidence on population trend and size. In the paper describing the species it was suggested that it be listed as data deficient until further surveys of likely habitat were undertaken. The limestone karst in which it lives is threatened by quarrying and habitat degradation caused by overgrazing.

References

External links
 Notes on the bird prior to its formal description by Stijn De Win

bare-faced bulbul
Birds of Laos
bare-faced bulbul